Dabusun or Dabuxun railway station  is a station on the Qingzang Railway near Dabusun Lake in Golmud County, Haixi Prefecture, Qinghai Province, China.

See also
 Qingzang Railway
 List of stations on Qingzang railway

 

Railway stations in Qinghai
Stations on the Qinghai–Tibet Railway